Jeffrey Bourne is the name of:

Jeff Bourne (1948–2014), English footballer/soccer player who played in England and the U.S.
Jeff Bourne (politician) (born 1976), Virginia attorney and member-elect of the Virginia House of Delegates